His Majesty's Young Offenders Institution Polmont is the largest of its kind in Scotland.

HMP Polmont first opened as a Borstal in 1911 in the buildings of the former Blairlodge Academy. The Academy had been forced to close in 1908 due to financial difficulties and subsequent outbreak of an infectious disease, and the Prison Commissioners bought the site in 1911.

It is designed to hold up to 760 inmates between the ages of 16 and 21, although there have been several reports and complaints about the literal figures. Reports of living conditions have also been criticised, including an alleged lack of food for inmates and the practice of slopping out.  Notable inmates include Luke Mitchell, and Chris Cunningham, star of BBC Scotland's The Scheme. More recently, the prison is home to child killer and child rapist Aaron Campbell.

References

External links
HM Prison Polmont on the Scottish Prison Service website

Young Offender Institutions in Scotland
Buildings and structures in Falkirk
1911 establishments in Scotland
Government agencies established in 1911